Miklós Ambrus (31 May 1933 – 3 August 2019) was a Hungarian water polo player, born in Eger who competed in the 1964 Summer Olympics.

Honours

National team 
Olympic Games: 1 time present at the Olympic Games
  1964 Tokyo

European Championship:
  1962 Leipzig

Universiade:
  1961 Sofia

55 present in the national team of

Club 
 Egeri Fáklya - As player of Eger (1950–1953)

 Bp. Kinizsi / Ferencváros - As player of FTC (1953–1956 and 1959–1968)
 OB I (5x): 1956, 1962, 1963, 1965, 1968
 Magyar Kupa (4x): 1962, 1964, 1965, 1967

 Melbourne Swimming Club - As player of Melbourne SC (1956–1958)

Individual

See also
 Hungary men's Olympic water polo team records and statistics
 List of Olympic champions in men's water polo
 List of Olympic medalists in water polo (men)
 List of men's Olympic water polo tournament goalkeepers

References

External links
 

1933 births
2019 deaths
Hungarian male water polo players
Water polo goalkeepers
Olympic water polo players of Hungary
Water polo players at the 1964 Summer Olympics
Olympic gold medalists for Hungary
Olympic medalists in water polo
Medalists at the 1964 Summer Olympics
Universiade medalists in water polo
Universiade bronze medalists for Hungary
Sportspeople from Eger
20th-century Hungarian people
21st-century Hungarian people